The 1956 United States presidential election in North Carolina took place on November 6, 1956, as part of the 1956 United States presidential election. North Carolina voters chose 14 representatives, or electors, to the Electoral College, who voted for president and vice president.

North Carolina was carried by Democratic nominee Adlai Stevenson of Illinois, with 50.66 percent of the popular vote, over incumbent Republican President Dwight D. Eisenhower. This was the last time until 1992 that North Carolina would vote for the losing candidate in a presidential election, and remains the last time that a Republican has won the presidency without carrying the state.

Results

Results by county

References

North Carolina
1956
1956 North Carolina elections